The Jamia Millia Islamia University Ground is a cricket ground in Delhi, India, part of the Jamia Millia Islamia University. It was established in 1989, and is one of the best playing surfaces of Delhi. Unusually, the ground features brick sightscreens.

The ground was host to a one day international during the 1997 Women's Cricket World Cup, with the Netherlands defeating Sri Lanka by 47 runs. In 2005, the ground hosted its first Test match: the match, a women's match between India and England, was drawn.

Notes

Cricket grounds in Delhi
Jamia Millia Islamia
University sports venues in India
Sports venues completed in 1989
1989 establishments in Delhi
20th-century architecture in India